The Governorate of New Toledo was a Spanish Governorate of the Crown of Castile formed from the previous southern half of the Inca Empire, stretching south into present day central Chile, and east into present day central Brazil.

It was established by King Charles I of Spain in 1528. Diego de Almagro was the appointed Spanish royal governor.

It was replaced by the Spanish Viceroyalty of Peru in 1542.

Governorates in Hispanic America
After the territorial division of South America between Spain and Portugal, the Peruvian Hispanic administration was divided into six entities: 
Province of Tierra Firme, included the Caribbean Coast, Central America, the Pacific Coast of Colombia and Mexico.
Governorate of New Castile, consisting of the territories from roughly the Ecuadorian-Colombian border in the north to Cuzco in the south.
Governorate of New Toledo, forming the previous southern half of the Inca empire, stretching towards central Chile.
Governorate of New Andalusia, which was not formally conquered by Spain until decades later.
Governorate of New León, the southernmost part of the continent until the Strait of Magellan.
Governorate of Terra Australis, territories from the south of the Strait of Magellan to the South Pole.

This territorial division set the basis for the Hispanic administration of South America for several decades. It was formally dissolved in 1544, when King Charles I sent his personal envoy, Blasco Núñez Vela, to govern the newly founded Viceroyalty of Peru that replaced the governorates.

See also
Spanish conquest of the Inca Empire
History of Chile

Spanish Empire

References

Governorates of the Spanish Empire
Colonial Peru
Colonial Brazil
Spanish colonization of the Americas
1520s in Peru
1530s in Peru
1540s in Peru
States and territories established in 1529
1529 establishments in the Spanish Empire
1529 establishments in South America
States and territories disestablished in 1542
1542 disestablishments in the Spanish Empire
1542 disestablishments in South America
1540s in the Viceroyalty of Peru
16th century in the Spanish Empire